Itaballia is a genus of butterflies in the family Pieridae found in Central and South America.

Species
Listed alphabetically:
Itaballia demophile (Linnaeus, 1763) – crossbarred white, cross-barred white, or black-banded white
Itaballia marana (Doubleday, 1844)
Itaballia pandosia (Hewitson, 1853) – Pisonis mimic, brown-bordered white

References

Pierini
Pieridae of South America
Pieridae genera